Paul Alfred Schroeter or Schröter (26 October 1866, Kempen - 1946, Rheinsberg) was a German painter and etcher.

Life and work 
He was descended from an old Hamburg family. In the 1880s, he studied at the Kunstakademie Düsseldorf with Eduard von Gebhardt, Johann Peter Theodor Janssen and Adolf Schill. There, he befriended Fritz Overbeck and became a member of the student association known as ""; providing illustrations for their occasional publications. Their fellow student, Peter Philippi, would later call Tartarus one of the most important artistic associations in Düsseldorf, after the professional group, Malkasten, describing its members as young, sociable and refreshing.

He remained there for a few years, becoming a member of the Munich Secession, and participating in their first exhibition of 1893. In 1895, he was awarded a large gold medal at the Große Berliner Kunstausstellung. 

He also provided illustrations, on commission, to the art journal, Jugend.

Overbeck was one of several friends who persuaded him to live at the new . With his wife, Grete, and his children, he moved there in 1901. He moved again, in 1904, to Bremen, where he became a member of the Deutscher Künstlerbund. His portraits and landscapes were widely known, but the reviews were not always positive. Die Kunst, a popular art magazine, declared that his works were technically fine, but very "impersonal".

In 1908, he left Bremen and settled near Berlin. Many of his works are in private collections. Most of the others were destroyed during World War II.

References

Further reading 
 Biography of Schroeter @ Von Volkert-Emrath
 "Schroeter, Paul", In: Hans Vollmer (Ed.): Allgemeines Lexikon der Bildenden Künstler von der Antike bis zur Gegenwart, Vol.30 : Scheffel–Siemerding. E. A. Seemann, Leipzig 1936, p.297

External links 

 More works by Schroeter @ ArtNet

1866 births
1946 deaths
German portrait painters
German landscape painters
Kunstakademie Düsseldorf alumni
Academy of Fine Arts, Munich alumni
People from Kępno County